Nell Feeney is an Australian actress who played Janelle Timmins on the Australian soap opera Neighbours from November 2004 to July 2007, returning briefly in 2015. She had also appeared in the soap the previous year as Joanne Blair. She was married to former cast member Shane Connor and together they have twins.

Her contract with Neighbours expired during the course of 2007, and she left the show along with Sianoa Smit-McPhee who plays her on-screen daughter Bree Timmins.  She also appeared in the movie Mallboy, also featuring her Neighbours on-screen husband Brett Swain.

She has appeared in many other Australian television shows, including City Homicide, Rush, Blue Heelers, Dirt Game, Stingers, and Winners & Losers.

Nell appeared in the ABC police drama Phoenix.

References

External links

Australian television actresses
Living people
Year of birth missing (living people)